The 1976 Winston 500 was a NASCAR Winston Cup Series race that took place on May 2, 1976, at Alabama International Motor Speedway (now Talladega Superspeedway) in Talladega, Alabama.

Coo Coo Marlin had a serious crash the weekend before while attempting a qualifying run for the ARCA race and was unable to compete in any of the weekend's competition due to a shoulder injury.

Background
Talladega Superspeedway, originally known as Alabama International Motor Superspeedway (AIMS), is a motorsports complex located north of Talladega, Alabama. It is located on the former Anniston Air Force Base in the small city of Lincoln. The track is a Tri-oval and was constructed by International Speedway Corporation, a business controlled by the France Family, in the 1960s. Talladega is most known for its steep banking and the unique location of the start/finish line - located just past the exit to pit road. The track currently hosts the NASCAR series such as the Sprint Cup Series, Xfinity Series, and the Camping World Truck Series.

Race report
His record of winning three races in a row at Talladega would not be broken until 2002 when Dale Earnhardt Jr. recorded his fourth consecutive victory at that track. There were 24 different leaders and three cautions for 14 laps. Attendance was 80,000. This apparently was the first time that a 500 mile race had been completed in under three hours; roughly comparable to a two-and-a-half hour National Basketball Association game or a two-hour Major League Soccer game that is quickly-paced and is based mostly on skill.

Baker had qualified 12th, and two days before the race Bud Moore's team transported the engine for the team's 1976 Ford Torino back to their shop in Spartanburg, SC for examination.  The engine was brought back to Talladega the day before the race.

Through his second-place finish, Yarborough managed to take the lead in championship points over Benny Parsons; who finished in 26th place during this event. Parsons was eliminated when Dick Brooks spun out of the lead group and was hit by David Pearson, Marcis, and Parsons. Petty finished fourth after losing a lap when he stalled out his car on pit road. Terry Ryan scores his best career finish with a fifth in just his second career start.

Prize winnings for this race varied from $25,285 for the winner ($ when considering inflation) all the way to $1,205 for last-place finisher Darrell Bryant ($ when considering inflation).

Qualifying

Top 10 finishers
Section reference: 
 Buddy Baker (No. 15), with an official time of 2:56:37
 Cale Yarborough (No. 11), 35 seconds down
 Bobby Allison (No. 2), 1 lap down
 Richard Petty (No. 43), 2 laps down
 Terry Ryan (No. 81), 4 laps down
 Cecil Gordon (No. 24), 4 laps down
 Donnie Allison (No. 28), 4 laps down
 Bruce Hill (No. 47), 6 laps down
 Dave Marcis (No. 71), 6 laps down
 Frank Warren (No. 79), 8 laps down

Standings after the race

References

Winston 500
NASCAR races at Talladega Superspeedway
Winston 500
Winston 500